Pheropsophus africanus is a species of ground beetles belonging to the family Carabidae.

Description
These beetles show bright reddish head, pronotum and legs and two yellow/orange spots and a slight yellow/orange band on the edge of dark brown elytra.

Distribution
This species is present in the subdesertic regions of Algeria, Egypt (Sinai),India, Iran, Iraq, Israel, Jordan, Libya, Morocco, Saudi Arabia, Tunisia and Yemen.

References

Brachininae
Beetles described in 1825